Guillermo Fuenzalida (24 March 1918 – 4 August 1977) was a Chilean footballer. He played in two matches for the Chile national football team in 1946. He was also part of Chile's squad for the 1946 South American Championship.

References

External links
 

1918 births
1977 deaths
Chilean footballers
Chile international footballers
Place of birth missing
Association football defenders
Colo-Colo footballers
Unión Española footballers